Jacques Iverny, Yverni or Iverni (active 1411 - 1435, died probably 1438) was a French painter, hailing from Avignon or from central France. He may be the same as the Master of Castello della Manta who is known from a large fresco of heroes and heroines in the Castello della Manta near Saluzzo, Piedmont. He has been attested in Avigno between 1411 and 1413, and between 1426 and 1438.

Works
Virgin and Child with Saint Stephen and Saint Lucy (triptych), Turin, Sabauda Gallery (signed)
Annunciation, 151 x 193 cm, National Gallery of Ireland

Disputed

Frescoes in the Castello della Manta
Thouzon retable, two panels in the Louvre which are according to Eileen Kane in The Burlington Magazine an early work of Iverny (1415 or earlier)

Notes

15th-century French painters
Year of birth unknown
1430s deaths